Dennis Gadbois (born September 18, 1963) is a former American football wide receiver. He played for the New England Patriots from 1987 to 1988.

References

1963 births
Living people
American football wide receivers
Boston University Terriers football players
New England Patriots players
Players of American football from Maine
Sportspeople from Biddeford, Maine
Biddeford High School alumni